The 1708 British general election was the first general election to be held after the Acts of Union had united the Parliaments of England and Scotland.

The election saw the Whigs finally gain a majority in the House of Commons, and by November the Whig-dominated parliament had succeeded in pressuring the Queen into accepting the Junto into the government for the first time since the late 1690s. The Whigs were unable to take full control of the government, however, owing to the continued presence of the moderate Tory Godolphin in the cabinet and the opposition of the Queen. Contests were held in 95 of the 269 English and Welsh constituencies and 28 of the 45 Scottish constituencies.

Summary of the constituencies
See 1796 British general election for details. The constituencies used were the same throughout the existence of the Parliament of Great Britain.

Dates of election
The first general election held since the Union took place between 30 April 1708 and 7 July 1708. At this period elections did not take place at the same time in every constituency. The returning officer in each county or borough fixed the precise date (see hustings for details of the conduct of the elections).

Results

Seats summary

See also
 List of parliaments of Great Britain
 2nd Parliament of Great Britain
 List of MPs elected in the British general election, 1708

References
 British Electoral Facts 1832–1999, compiled and edited by Colin Rallings and Michael Thrasher (Ashgate Publishing Ltd 2000). (For dates of elections before 1832, see the footnote to Table 5.02).

External links
 History of Parliament: Members 1690–1715
 History of Parliament: Constituencies 1690–1715

1708 in politics
General election
1708